Sport Club Poltava is a professional Ukrainian football club from the city of Poltava. The team is currently playing Ukrainian Second League after competing in the Ukrainian Amateur championship.

History
The team was founded in 2011 by two football enthusiasts, a football veteran of FC Vorskla Poltava Volodymyr Sysenko and a local journalist Stanislav Maizus. The first team was formed based on students out of schools of the Poltava's Levada neighborhood. Before 2014, the club playing in regional competitions of Poltava Oblast remained in a shadow of another more successful club FC Poltava which at that time competed at the Ukrainian Second League. During that period SC Poltava played its home games at the FC Poltava training base in Kopyly. In 2014 SC Poltava became a champion of Poltava Oblast, but ceased its existence for several seasons due to lack of funding. The 2014 championship title for SC Poltava became the first title for Poltava-based teams at competitions in Poltava Oblast in 19 years (Velta Poltava, 1995). In 2014 for SC Poltava played several professional footballers who retired or were recovering from injuries included Yuriy Fomenko, Ruslan Solyanyk, others.

In 2019, five years later, Sysenko and Maizus managed to invite Serhiy Ivashchenko who became the club's president providing necessary funding and SC Poltava was revived. Serhiy Ivashchenko owns a construction company "Kombinat vyrobnychykh pidpryiemstv" (Complex of manufacturing enterprises). By that time FC Poltava already withdrew from all of competitions after a scandal with the stadium in 2018. In 2019–20 SC Poltava entered the AAFU cup competitions and in 2020–21 debuted at the AAFU championship. The club placed 5th within its group in its first national football season. Later SC Poltava was admitted to the Professional Football League of Ukraine and entered the 2021–22 Ukrainian Second League competitions.

Honours
 Poltava Oblast championship
 Winner (1): 2014

Players

Current squad

League and cup history

{|class="wikitable"
|-bgcolor="#efefef"
! Season
! Div.
! Pos.
! Pl.
! W
! D
! L
! GS
! GA
! P
!Domestic Cup
!colspan=2|Europe
!Notes
|-bgcolor=SteelBlue
|align=center|2020–21
|align=center|4th
|align=center|5
|align=center|22
|align=center|14
|align=center|4
|align=center|4
|align=center|51
|align=center|20
|align=center|46
|align=center|
|align=center|
|align=center|
|align=center bgcolor=lightgreen|Promoted
|-bgcolor=PowderBlue
|align=center|2021–22
|align=center|3rd
|align=center|
|align=center|	
|align=center|	 	
|align=center|		
|align=center|
|align=center|	 	 	
|align=center|	
|align=center|
|align=center|
|align=center|
|align=center|
|align=center bgcolor=lightgreen|Promoted
|-bgcolor=LightCyan
|align=center|2022–23
|align=center|2nd
|align=center|
|align=center|	
|align=center|	 	
|align=center|		
|align=center|
|align=center|	 	 	
|align=center|	
|align=center|
|align=center|
|align=center|
|align=center|
|align=center|
|}

Non-playing personnel

Presidents
 2011–2014  Stanislav Maizus
 2019–  Serhiy Ivashchenko

Managers
 2011–2014  Volodymyr Sysenko
 2019–  Volodymyr Sysenko

References

External links
 Official website
 Profile. AAFU.

SC Poltava
Ukrainian First League clubs
Football clubs in Poltava Oblast
2011 establishments in Ukraine
Association football clubs established in 2011